Enzo Carlo Cabrera Borlando (born 1 April 1985) was a Chilean footballer.

He played several years for Audax Italiano.

Honours

Player
Audax Italiano
Primera División de Chile (1): Runner-up 2006 Clausura

External links
 
 

1985 births
Living people
Chilean footballers
Audax Italiano footballers
Magallanes footballers
Chilean Primera División players
Primera B de Chile players
Association football midfielders